Dóra Zeller (born 6 January 1995) is a Hungarian football forward playing for BK Häcken playing in Sweden's Damallsvenskan. She is a member of the Hungarian national team.

International goals

References

1995 births
Living people
Hungarian women's footballers
Hungarian expatriate sportspeople in Germany
Expatriate women's footballers in Germany
Újpesti TE (women) players
Ferencvárosi TC (women) footballers
TSG 1899 Hoffenheim (women) players
Bayer 04 Leverkusen (women) players
Hungary women's international footballers
People from Esztergom
Women's association football forwards
Sportspeople from Komárom-Esztergom County